The 1986 Liège–Bastogne–Liège was the 72nd edition of the Liège–Bastogne–Liège cycle race and was held on 20 April 1986. The race started and finished in Liège. The race was won by Moreno Argentin of the  team.

General classification

References

1986
1986 in Belgian sport
1986 Super Prestige Pernod International